Georgi Borisov (born 21 October 1974) is a Bulgarian former professional footballer who has also worked as manager.

Career

Club career
Borisov came through the youth system of Loko Sofia and made his A PFG debut on 25 April 1991, in the railwaymen's 3:0 home win over Chernomorets Burgas, impressing with his performance. In the summer of 1997, he was signed by Levski Sofia on the insistence of coach Stefan Grozdanov and manager & player's agent Andrey Zhelyazkov. Notable highlights during his stay with the "bluemen" included a strong performance in the 1998 Bulgarian Cup Final against archrivals CSKA Sofia, which Levski Sofia won by a score of 5:0, as well as the netting of three goals in the 8:1 rout against Belarusian side Lokomotiv-96 Vitebsk on 13 August 1998 (the second largest margin of victory in European club tournaments for the team) in a UEFA Cup Winners' Cup match. He is the second Levski Sofia player (after legend Nikola Kotkov) to score a hat-trick for the team in European competitions.

However, shortly after that he returned to Loko Sofia and his career began to stagnate, with the footballer never reaching his previous heights. Borisov subsequently had a stint in Israel (first moving to the country  in 2000) with Bnei Sakhnin and Hapoel Ramat Gan. He then played for Loko Sofia, Dorostol Silistra, Balkan Botevgrad, and Minyor Pernik before retiring. After the end of his playing career, Borisov studied to become a manager in Dimitar Penev's coaching school between 2007 and 2008, and also took a number of other jobs outside of sports. His current focus is his own private footballing school "Ferion", where he works with the children.

Borisov is regarded as a very talented footballer who fell short of fulfilling his full potential.

International career
He made his debut for Bulgaria on 12 April 1995, in the 0:0 away draw with Macedonia in a friendly match.

References

External links 
 Profile at LevskiSofia.info

1974 births
Living people
Bulgarian footballers
Bulgaria international footballers
FC Lokomotiv 1929 Sofia players
PFC Levski Sofia players
Bnei Sakhnin F.C. players
Hapoel Ramat Gan F.C. players
PFC Minyor Pernik players
First Professional Football League (Bulgaria) players
Liga Leumit players
Expatriate footballers in Israel
Bulgarian expatriate sportspeople in Israel
Bulgarian expatriate footballers
Association football forwards
Bulgarian football managers